St. Peter's Roman Catholic Church may refer to:

Ireland
St. Peter's Roman Catholic Church, Drogheda

United States
(alphabetical by state, then city)
St. Peter's Roman Catholic Church-St. Mary's School, Southbridge, Massachusetts, listed on the National Register of Historic Places (NRHP)
St. Peter's Roman Catholic Church (Echo, Oregon), NRHP-listed
St. Peter's Roman Catholic Church (The Dalles, Oregon), NRHP-listed
St. Peter's Roman Catholic Church (Columbia, South Carolina)
St. Peter's Roman Catholic Church (Boerne, Texas), the subject of a 1997 U.S. Supreme Court case
St. Peter's Roman Catholic Church (Lindsay, Texas), NRHP-listed
St. Peter's Roman Catholic Church (Harpers Ferry, West Virginia), NRHP-listed
St. Peter's Roman Catholic Church (Ashton, Wisconsin), NRHP-listed

See also
 St. Peter's Church (disambiguation)